The Pool Hustlers ("I, Chiara and lo Scuro") is a 1982 Italian comedy-drama film directed by Maurizio Ponzi. It was screened in the Un Certain Regard section at the 1983 Cannes Film Festival.  It was co-written by Ponzi, male lead Francesco Nuti and established screenwriters Franco Ferrini and Enrico Oldoini.  The symbolic names of the characters mentioned in the Italian title, "Chiara" and "lo Scuro", mean "Bright" or "Clear", and "the Dark One" or "the Darkness", respectively.

Cast
 Francesco Nuti as Francesco Piccoli a.k.a. "il Toscano" ("the Tuscan")
 Giuliana De Sio as Chiara
 Marcello Lotti (as Marcello Lotti) - "lo Scuro" ("the Dark One")
 Antonio Petrocelli as Mancino
 Novello Novelli (as Novellantonio Novelli) - Merlo
 Renato Cecchetto as Giovanni
 Claudio Casale
 Carlo Neri
 Claudio Spadaro
 Stefano Cuneo
 Pierangelo Pozzato (as Pietro Angelo Pozzato)

References

External links

1982 comedy-drama films
1982 films
Cue sports films
Films directed by Maurizio Ponzi
Films scored by Carlo Maria Cordio
Italian comedy-drama films
1980s Italian-language films
Films set in Rome
1980s Italian films